Gill Robb Wilson (September 18, 1892 – September 8, 1966)  was an American pilot, Presbyterian minister, and military advocate. Wilson was a founder of the Civil Air Patrol.

Early life
Wilson was born in Clarion County, Pennsylvania to the Rev. Gill Irwin Wilson and Amanda E. Robb, on September 18, 1892.

World War I
Motivated by youthful idealism and a deep sense of responsibility, Gill Robb and his brother Volney traveled to France to assist the Allied war effort. After initially driving ambulances he became a member of the Lafayette Flying Corps (not the Lafayette Escadrille). His service for the French was with French Escadrille Br. 117. He is also reported to have served with the 163d Aero Squadron

The ministry
A son of a Presbyterian minister, Gill Robb Wilson followed in his father's footsteps after the Great War. He attended seminary in Pittsburgh and was ordained into a forerunner of the current Presbyterian Church, (USA). During his upbringing and training for the ministry, Gill Robb acquired an accomplished skill with the spoken and written word. This training would serve him well in later years. He was installed as Pastor of the Fourth Presbyterian Church of Trenton, New Jersey. During this pastorate (in 1927), Gill Robb Wilson was named Chaplain of the American Legion. After the death of his first wife and second child, he suffered the loss of his voice. Doctors required complete silence if his voice was to have the chance of ever coming back. It was at this point that he left the leadership of the Fourth Presbyterian Church of Trenton where he had enjoyed a fruitful ministry.

Professional life
Drawing upon his extensive experience in aviation and good standing in Trenton, New Jersey, the Hon. Gill Robb Wilson became Director of Aeronautics for the State of New Jersey in 1930. As such, he shared in oversight of the Lakehurst landing field and participated as a member of the Inquiry Board (appointed by the U.S. Secretary of Commerce) related to the crash of the zeppelin Hindenburg. He saw a need and imagined the possibilities for aviation in America. Crucial to those possibilities was the Civil Air Patrol. He promoted and fostered that dream, becoming the first director of the Civil Air Patrol. In 1939 he became the very first member of the Aircraft Owners and Pilots Association (AOPA) which is now the world's largest general aviation association with approximately 400,000 members. He also served as the editor of AOPA's first publication. He witnessed the test of the atomic bomb on Bikini Island. It is likely after effects of this event contributed to illness that later led to his death.

Writing career
Combining his love of aviation and skill with the pen, Gill Robb Wilson was an early editor of Flying Magazine. In World War II, he was a correspondent for the Herald Tribune. Wilson was also the author of a book of poetry, which included some pieces on World War I aviation, and the autobiographical work, I Walked with Giants, Vantage Press, 1968.

Wilson wrote the foreword to popular aviation writer Richard Bach's first book, "Stranger to the ground."

Family facts
Gill Robb Wilson was married to Margaret Perrine and had a bright and creative daughter, Margaret Robb Wilson. His first wife, Margaret Perrine Wilson, succumbed to the influenza epidemic while she was pregnant with their second daughter. He married his second wife, Mary Josephine Clary, on April 28, 1931 in Parkersburg, West Virginia. Gill Robb Wilson died in Los Angeles County, California. He is greatly honored by the CAP California Wing each Memorial Day.

Legacy
 Gill Robb Wilson Award
 the Mid-Ohio Valley Regional Airport in Parkersburg, WV, is named Gill Robb Wilson Field.
His legacy is also continued in his granddaughter,  who is a minister and a Chaplain Major in the  Civil Air Patrol

References

External links 
 Civil Air Patrol
 Flying Magazine
 The Hindenburg Disaster
 

1892 births
1966 deaths
American male journalists
20th-century American journalists
Aviators from Pennsylvania
American Presbyterian ministers
20th-century American clergy
Military personnel from Pennsylvania
American military personnel of World War I